Khin San Yi (also spelt Khin San Yee) is a Burmese development economist, previously served as Minister for Education of Myanmar and Minister for Science and Technology of Myanmar from February 2014 to 30 March 2016. She became the second Burmese woman to be appointed minister by the Thein Sein administration. She was appointed by Thein Sein after the death of her predecessor, Mya Aye and Ko Ko Oo, in December 2013 and December 2015.

She is also a former rector of the Yangon Institute of Economics, serving from 2008 to 2012. In April 2012, she was appointed as a deputy minister at the Ministry of National Planning and Economic Development, where she served under Kan Zaw until his recommendation that she be appointed Minister of Education.

She is an alumna of the Yangon Institute of Economics, graduating with a bachelor's degree in commerce (specialty in accounting and auditing) and a master's degree in trade and marketing. She pursued doctorate studies at the University of Göttingen in Germany, earning a doctorate degree in economics degree in 1996. She began pursuing doctorate studies in Germany in 1989. However, her studies were interrupted when the Burmese government recalled all foreign exchange students in Europe after being subjected by sanctions. She completed her studies five years later, in 1996.

References

Burmese economists
Living people
Government ministers of Myanmar
University of Göttingen alumni
Education ministers
Education ministers of Myanmar
Women government ministers of Myanmar
Year of birth missing (living people)